Whittingham is a surname. Notable people with the surname include:

Bob Whittingham, English footballer
Byron Whittingham (1870–1942), American politician
Charles Whittingham, English printer
Charles Whittingham (1795–1876), English printer and nephew of the above
Charlie Whittingham, American thoroughbred race horse trainer
Guy Whittingham, professional footballer
Fred Whittingham, American football player and coach
Jack Whittingham, British playwright, film critic, and screenwriter
Ken Whittingham, American TV director
Kyle Whittingham, American football head coach
M. Stanley Whittingham, chemist
Peter Whittingham (1984–2020), English footballer
Sam Whittingham, Canadian cyclist
Samuel Ford Whittingham (1772–1841), British officer of the Napoleonic Wars 
William Whittingham (c. 1524–1579), English Biblical scholar and religious reformer
William Rollinson Whittingham (1805–1879), 4th Episcopal bishop of Maryland 

Fictional characters:
Professor Richard Whittingham, character from the BBC Radio 4 comedy series Old Harry's Game